The Crestview–Fort Walton Beach–Destin, Florida, Metropolitan Statistical Area, as defined by the United States Census Bureau, is a metropolitan area consisting of two counties in northwest Florida, anchored by the cities of Crestview, Florida, and Fort Walton Beach, Florida. As of the 2010 census, the MSA had a population of 235,865, and a 2012 population estimate of 247,665.

The metropolitan area is a part of the "Northwest Corridor" which includes the Pensacola metropolitan area and the Panama City metropolitan area.

Counties
Okaloosa
Walton

Communities

Places with 20,000 to 50,000 inhabitants
Crestview
Fort Walton Beach

Places with 5,000 to 20,000 inhabitants
DeFuniak Springs
Destin
Niceville
Valparaiso

Places with 1,000 to 5,000 inhabitants
Freeport
Mary Esther

Places with 500 to 1,000 inhabitants
Laurel Hill
Paxton
Shalimar

Places with fewer than 500 inhabitants
Cinco Bayou

Demographics
As of the census of 2010, there were 235,865 people, 95,892 households, and 63,964 families residing within the MSA. The racial makeup of the MSA was 81.1% White, 9.3% African American, 0.3% Native American, 2.9% Asian, 0.1% Pacific Islander, 0.2% from other races, and 3.9% from two or more races. Hispanic or Latino of any race were 6.8% of the population.

According to the 2010 American Community Survey 1-Year Estimates, the median income for a household in the MSA was $52,303 and the median income for a family was $62,757. For full-time, year round employment, males had a median earnings of $42,955 versus $33,220 for females. The per capita income for the MSA was $27,071.

See also
Florida census statistical areas

References

Geography of Okaloosa County, Florida
Geography of Walton County, Florida